Club Natació Montjuïc is a Spanish swimming and water polo club from Barcelona established in 1944. It won eight national championships between 1972 and 1986, and it reached the final of the 1979 European Cup and the 1983 Cup Winners' Cup, lost respectively to Orvosegyetem SC and CSKA Moscow.

Titles
 División de Honor
 1972, 1976, 1977, 1978, 1979, 1984, 1885, 1986

Notable former players
 Sergio López
 Salva Gómez
 Manuel Silvestre
 Ángel Andreo
 Daniel Ballart

References

External links
Official website

Water polo clubs in Catalonia
Sports clubs in Barcelona
Sports clubs established in 1944